The Council of Baptist Churches in Northeast India is a Baptist Christian denomination in North East India. It is a member of the Asia Pacific Baptist Federation. 
It is also a member body of the North East India Christian Council, the regional council of the National Council of Churches in India.  The  Council of Baptist Churches in Northeast India has six Baptist conventions, 1,431,417 members in 8,245 churches. Its presently led by Mr. Norbu Lama as President and Rev. Prof. Akheto Sema as General Secretary.

History
The first American Baptist missionaries reached North East India in 1836. Nathan Brown and O.T. Cutter, along with their wives, came to Assam hoping to find access to China through the Shans territory to Northern frontier of Burma and Assam. The group sailed up the Brahmaputra river and arrived in Sadiya on 23 March 1836, and there confronted them with dense jungles, hostile tribals and rugged hills. Yet, believing they had been led to a fruitful place they began to learn Assamese language, set up their printing press, and gave themselves to the task of translating, publishing and teaching. Thus began the work of the Baptist in the north-eastern corner of India-the beginning of CBCNEI.

Beginning from Sadiya, the work moved down the Brahmaputra river to the leading towns of Assam plains, for example, Sibsagar, Nowgong and Gauhati. Then the first Church in Garo Hills, was established at Rajasimla in 1867. The first thrust among the Nagas came from the small village of Namsang in Tirap.

Miles Bronson and family settled a short time in that village, but the work was abandoned due to illness in the family before the end of 1840. The next move in Nagaland was by Godhula Brown, an Assamese convert, and the Rev. Edwin W. Clark. The first Church among the Nagas was organized in 1872, at Dokhahaimong (Molungyimjen) village in Ao area. Rev. William Pettigrew started the Baptist Mission work in Manipur in 1896. The work among the (Mikirs) Karbis was started quite early but it did not gain much progress because of the influence of Hinduism among the people. So the work in this area has been restricted to the fringe areas adjoining the plains of Assam.

The field work in North-East India was largely the responsibility of the American Baptist Mission until 1950. In fact, the Mission could not handle the full obligation of the area and so in the 1940 the area on the North Bank of Brahmaputra river was handed over to the care of the Australian Baptist Mission (for Goalpara district) and to the General Baptist Conference (for Darrang and North Lakhimpur districts).

From the early days of the missions in North-East India there were joint meetings of missionaries and nationals to plan the work. In 1914, the National Churches formed themselves into Assam Baptist Convention (ABC). This organization grew in its stature, and finally in January 1950, the Council of Baptist Churches in Assam (CBCA) was formed by the amalgamation of Assam Baptist Missionary Conference under the leadership of its First General Secretary, Rev. A. F. Merrill. Later the name was changed to CBCAM, and finally, the Council of Baptist Churches in North-East India on geographical grounds. Almost all the Baptist Churches in Assam, Arunachal, Manipur, Meghalaya and Nagaland were brought within the Council. So since the year 1950 the field works has been brought under the ministry of the Council of Baptist Churches in North East India (CBCNEI).

Over the years the CBCNEI has grown to now over 7000 Churches in 100 organized Associations. They are administered under six regional Conventions namely, Assam Baptist Convention, Arunachal Baptist Church Council (ABCC), Garo Baptist Convention (GBC), Karbi Anglong Baptist Convention (KABC), Manipur Baptist Convention (MBC), and Nagaland Baptist Church Council (NBCC).

Member organizations
The Council of Baptist Churches in Northeast India ("CBCNEI" or the "Council") is a conglomeration of Six Baptist Conventions, namely: Arunachal Baptist Churches Council, Assam Baptist Convention, Karbi Anglong Baptist Convention, Garo Baptist Convention, Manipur Baptist Convention, and Nagaland Baptist Churches Council and their Associations and Churches.

Conventions
 Assam Baptist Convention
 Arunachal Baptist Church Council
 Garo Baptist Convention
 Karbi Anglong Baptist Convention
 Manipur Baptist Convention
 Nagaland Baptist Church Council

Theological Colleges of CBCNEI

Eastern Theological College (ETC)
Founded in 1905 by the Rev. S.A.D. Boggs, sent by the American Baptist Mission Society now called the Board of International Ministries of the American Baptist Churches in the USA, Eastern Theological College, Jorhat, Assam celebrates 100 years of its ministry in Northeast India and hosts the Senate of Serampore Convocation on 12 February 2005. Eastern Theological College (ETC), the premier theological and training institute of the Council of Baptist Churches in Northeast India has been catering to the ever-growing and diverse needs of the region and even beyond in the field of leadership development for the last 100 years. Today ETC boasts of more than 2500 graduates working in various fields of Christian ministry, including more than 800 serving pastors in rural areas.

Affiliated seminaries
 Baptist Theological College, Nagaland
 Clark Theological College, Mokokchung, Nagaland
 Harding Theological College, Tura, Garo Hills 
 Manipur Theological College, Kanggui, Manipur
 Oriental Theological Seminary, Chümoukedima, Nagaland
 Shalom Bible Seminary, Kohima, Nagaland
 Trinity Theological College, Dimapur, Nagaland

Hospitals 

The Council has Six hospitals which are providing healthcare to the sick and the suffering. They are located in four states in the region.

 Babupara Christian Hospital, Garo Hills
 Impur Christian Hospital, Nagaland
 Jorhat Christian Medical Centre, Assam
 Kanggui Christian Hospital, Manipur
 Tura Christian Hospital, Garo Hills
 Satribari Christian Hospital, Assam

Missions
Mission Desk coordinates mission activities not only of the evangelists from the conventions, but it also functions as a facilitator for mission partnerships between other mission agencies and the local church associations and conventions. The department also organizes community development works among the poor and needy areas of the Northeast region.

Conference centre
Located on the flush green cool campus of the CBCNEI, the Conference Center caters the needs of the Council’s program activities and other Christian Organization program.

Student ministry
The Council runs three hostels for college students. Through these institutions the boarders have the opportunities to attend Bible camps, vesper services, theological lectures, Bible studies, games and sports.

 White Memorial Hostel Ministry
 Lewis Memorial Hostel Ministry
 Shillong Tyrannus Hall

Christian Literature Centre (CLC)
CLC is the literature wing, of the Council of Baptist Churches in North East India in order to cater to the needs of the churches in North East India having various languages and dialects. It was established in 1969.

 CLC Guwahati
 CLC Dimapur
 CLC Imphal
 CLC Senapati
 CLC Ukhrul

Statistics
Churches and Membership figures as reported to the Baptist World Alliance as of 2016.

See also
 Baptist World Alliance
Boro Baptist Church Association
Boro Baptist Convention
Rabha Baptist Church Union
 List of Christian denominations in North East India
 North East India Christian Council

References

External links
Site of the Council of Baptist Churches in Northeast India

Baptist denominations in India
Christianity in Manipur
Affiliated institutions of the National Council of Churches in India